Chun In-soo (born July 13, 1965) is a South Korean archer and Olympic champion. He competed at the 1988 Summer Olympics in Seoul, and won a gold medal with the South Korean archery team. He also competed in the men's individual event at the 1984 Summer Olympics.

References

External links

1965 births
Living people
South Korean male archers
Olympic archers of South Korea
Archers at the 1984 Summer Olympics
Archers at the 1988 Summer Olympics
Olympic gold medalists for South Korea
Olympic medalists in archery
Asian Games medalists in archery
Archers at the 1986 Asian Games
Medalists at the 1988 Summer Olympics
Asian Games gold medalists for South Korea
Asian Games bronze medalists for South Korea
Medalists at the 1986 Asian Games
20th-century South Korean people
21st-century South Korean people